Events from the year 1747 in Russia

Incumbents
 Monarch – Elizabeth I

Events

  
 Engels, Saratov Oblast

Births

 Alexander Bezborodko
 Arkady Morkov

Deaths

 
 
 
 Ekaterina Alekseyevna Dolgorukova

References

1747 in Russia
Years of the 18th century in the Russian Empire